Robert Francis Petrella (born November 7, 1944) is a former American football defensive back in the American Football League (AFL) and National Football League (NFL) who played for the Miami Dolphins. He played college football for the Tennessee Volunteers.

References

1944 births
Living people
American football defensive backs
Miami Dolphins players
Tennessee Volunteers football players